Ryan Cheng Chun Wang (Chinese: 鄭進泓; born 11 February 2001, in Hong Kong) is a Hong Kong professional footballer who currently plays as a midfielder for Hong Kong Premier League club Lee Man.

Club career

Southern
Cheng was a youth product of Southern. He was promoted to the first team in the 2019–20 season, which he made 5 league appearances in his first season.

On 17 July 2022, Cheng left the club.

Lee Man
On 25 July 2022, Cheng joined Lee Man.

References

External links
 嚴選今季港超五大矚目新星
 HKFA

2001 births
Living people
Hong Kong people
Hong Kong footballers
Hong Kong Premier League players
Southern District FC players
Lee Man FC players
Association football midfielders